Michelle Orpe is a British TV presenter, columnist and poker personality.

Career

Television hosting 

Orpe began her career hosting 'Rem Con Raiders' for Image Wizard Television for Channel Five and moved on to host the FIA European Drag Racing Championships, aired on Sky Sports and Eurosports. After two years travelling around Europe hosting the drag racing she was asked to become lead presenter on the award-winning show 'Poker Night Live' for Pokerzone, which she hosted four nights a week during 2005-2007, as well as hosting a weekly poker news highlight show called "In Poker". She also wrote a column in Industry magazine 'Flush' focusing on her progression in the game. In 2008, alongside Poker Night Live, she hosted the world's toughest, full contact, action Motorsport - European Stock Car Racing, aired on Channel Five.

Orpe became known as one of the faces of 'Sky Poker', a dedicated poker channel on Sky Television channel 865 (alongside Helen Chamberlain, Richard Orford, Kara Scott, Tony Kendall, Ed Giddins and Norman Pace) where she spent two years from 2007-2009, before becoming the main TV Host for the 2009/2010 seasons of the Pokerstars 'European Poker Tour', aired on Channel Four. Alongside this she hosted the 'European Karting Championships' and Matchrooms 'Poker Millions VII', both aired on Sky Sports.

Poker 

Orpe has played in various televised celebrity poker tournaments broadcast on Challenge and Five, including the 2008 PartyPoker.net 'Women's World Open II' where she won her heat and placed fifth in the final. She also appeared alongside Caroline Feraday, Willie Thorne and Brandon Block in the 2008 888.com UK Open and the 2009 PartyPoker.com European Open V alongside Du'aine Ladejo, Austin Healey and Rod Harrington. In 2008 she signed a sponsorship deal with Purple Lounge Poker
Becoming their resident professional, she played in twelve Poker Tournaments over three months and cashed in four, she placed tenth in The Ladbrokes European Ladies Championships, second in a WPS - Ocean World Poker Showdown side event in Puerto Plata, fifth in the Women's World Open II and she also won her seat into an EPT event at the Vic Casino in London. Even though she had great success in the first few months of her sponsorship, she decided her heart was with TV and left Purple Lounge to host Sky Poker.

Michelle also wrote a weekly column for the learn section of global internet poker news company Pokernews.

Currently she is the Social Media and Live Events Host for partypoker UK in coalition with Dusk Till Dawn Poker Room in Nottingham. She runs the UK partypoker Facebook Community Forum and Twitter accounts.

References

External links
 

British television presenters
Living people
British columnists
Year of birth missing (living people)